Tobruk is a town and a seaport in Libya.

Tobruk, Tubruk or Tubruq may also refer to:

Military
 Siege of Tobruk, a prolonged campaign in World War II
 Axis capture of Tobruk, the capture of Tobruk by German and Italian forces over the period 17–21 June 1942 in World War II

 HMAS Tobruk, two ships of the Royal Australian Navy
 SS Tobruk, a Polish transport ship during World War II
 Tobruk, a type of concrete fortification used during World War II; See Defensive fighting position

Arts and entertainment
 Tobruk (1967 film), a 1967 movie
 Tobruk (2008 film), a 2008 movie
 Tobruk, a book by Peter Rabe, based upon the 1967 movie
 Tobruk (game), a 1975 wargame
 Tobruk (video game), a 1987 video game
 Tobruk (band), a British Rock Band

Other uses
 Tobruk District, a former name of Butnan District, Libya
 Beitar Nes Tubruk F.C., Israeli football club and academy